Partridge Island may refer to:

 Partridge Island, Bermuda
 Partridge Island (Saint John County), an island in New Brunswick, Canada
 Partridge Island (Nova Scotia), peninsula in Canada
 Partridge Island (Ontario), uninhabited island in Canada
 Partridge Island (Tasmania), island in Australia
 Partridge Island (New York), island in United States